Cynthia Johnson (born April 22, 1956) is an American singer, songwriter and television personality. She is best known as the lead singer of the band Lipps Inc. with the worldwide smash hit "Funkytown".

Musical career

Beginnings
Prior to becoming the lead singer of Lipps Inc., Johnson had become well-known locally for winning the 1976 Miss Black Minnesota, USA pageant, and for being the lead vocalist of the well-known Minneapolis band Flyte Tyme for seven years. Being also an accomplished saxophone player, Johnson utilized her saxophone talents in Flyte Tyme, and she was also the songwriter of many of their songs. Johnson also co-wrote some songs with band members Jimmy Jam and Terry Lewis, today a multi-Grammy award winning songwriting and producing team.
Johnson completed her undergraduate degree at the University of Minnesota, Morris in 1978, and continued to perform with Flyte Tyme for a brief time. Shortly after she left Flyte Tyme, the band evolved into The Time, a side project of Prince.

Lipps Inc.
Johnson was the lead singer of the popular Minneapolis-based band Lipps Inc., best known for its 1980 song "Funkytown". The song hit No. 1 in 28 countries, sold more than 35 million copies worldwide, and earned a place in the "One-Hit Wonders" section of the Rock & Roll Museum in Cleveland, Ohio. Other singles include "Designer Music" and "Rock It", but the group never matched the success of "Funkytown", which continues to influence popular culture. The group received several awards, among them three Billboard Music Awards and "Soul Record of the Year" by the AMOA association. Johnson left the band after the group's third album Designer Music was released.

Late 1980s to present
Johnson has continued her musical career and remains active as a member of the three-time Grammy Award-winning gospel group Sounds of Blackness, as a musician on albums by Maceo Parker and Prince, on labels such as Motown, and on projects of Grammy-winning producers Jimmy Jam and Terry Lewis. She also has worked as a jingle singer on commercials for products from 3M, Volkswagen, Nissan, Target, FedEx, Ford and McDonald's. She has also sung for U.S. presidents. Johnson was the host of the first episode of the FunkyTown TV series, produced by the Minneapolis-based production company, Megabien Entertainment.

Solo career
In addition to working with others, Johnson continues her career as a solo artist. Her debut album, All That I Am, was released on December 15, 2013 on the Megabien Music label.

Discography

Solo albums and lead vocalist
 1979  Mouth to Mouth – Lipps, Inc. – Lead Vocals 
 1980  Pucker Up – Lipps, Inc. – Lead Vocals
 1981  Designer Music – Lipps, Inc. – Lead Vocals, songwriter
 1992  Funkyworld – Lipps, Inc. – Lead Vocals
 2003  Funkytown – Lipps, Inc. – Lead Vocals, songwriter, composer
 2013  All That I Am – Main Vocals, songwriter, producer

Additional appearances
 1978  A Touch on the Rainy Side – Jesse Winchester – Choir/Chorus	
 1980 Billboard Top Dance Hits: 1980 – Saxophone, Vocals	
 1987 Kiss Serious – Chico DeBarge – backing vocals
 1988  Just Like That – Brownmark – backing vocals	
 1988  Personal & Attention – Stacy Lattisaw – backing vocals	
 1988  When the Lights Go Out – Pia Zadora – backing vocals	
 1988 Carry On, Vol. 2 – Ipso Facto – Vocals	
 1988 Omaiyo – Robin Adnan Anders – Vocals	
 1990 I Am – Elisa Fiorillo – backing vocals	
 1990 The Brojos – The Brojos – Rap, backing vocals	
 1991 Here It Is – Jevetta Steele – backing vocals	
 1991 Imperial Bells of China – Hubei Song & Dance Ensemble – Photography	
 1993 Here It Is – Jevetta Steele – backing vocals	
 1994 African-American Music in Minnesota – Vocals	
 1995 It Must Be Christmas – 	Debbie Duncan – Choir/Chorus, Vocals
 1996 Best of the Singer's Voice – Performer, Primary Artist	
 1996 Greatest Hits – Georgia Mass Choir – Choir/Chorus	
 1998  Lonnie Hunter & The Voices of St. Mark – Lonnie Hunter – Alto Vocals	
 1998  Lost in the Blues – Doug Maynard – backing vocals	
 1998  River of Song: A Musical Journey Down the Mississippi – Producer	
 1999  Loud Guitars, Big Suspicions – Shannon Curfman – backing vocals	
 1999 Billboard Top Dance Hits: 1976–1980 – Saxophone, Vocals	
 2002 Solid Gold Funk – Vocals	
 2002 Soul Symphony – 	Sounds of Blackness – Alto Vocals
 2003 Angels on the Freeway – Kevin Bowe – Vocals	
 2003 Cross N Water – Ford – Vocals, backing vocals	
 2003 David Young – David Young – backing vocals	
 2003 Made by Maceo – 	Maceo Parker – backing vocals
 2003 Sweet Talk – Reneé Austin – backing vocals	
 2004 Deliverance – Shane Henry – backing vocals	
 2005  In the Fellowship – Patrick Lundy – Tenor Vocals	
 2005  Right About Love – Reneé Austin – Vocal Harmony, backing vocals	
 2005 School's In! – Maceo Parker – Vocals, backing vocals	
 2005 Unity – Sounds of Blackness – Alto Vocals, Primary Artist, Vocals	
 2005 Unity [2005] – Unity – 	Alto (Vocals), Primary Artist, Vocals
 2006  I'll Play All Night Long – John McAndrew – backing vocals	
 2006  Overflow – 	Kevin Davidson – Banjo
 2007  Between Saturday Night and Sunday Morning – Mick Sterling – Main Personnel, Vocals, backing vocals	
 2007  Kings and Queens: Message from the Movement – Sounds of Blackness – Alto Vocals	
 2007  The One Who's Leavin' – Doug Spartz – backing vocals	
 2010 Chinese Whispers – Alison Scott – backing vocals	
 2010 Life's a Party: the Best of In Between – Primary Artist	
 2011 Hope One Mile – 	G.B. Leighton – Vocal Harmony
 2011 Sounds of Blackness – Sounds of Blackness – Alto Vocals, Group Member, Vocals	
 2012 Natchez Trace – Kevin Bowe – 	Vocal Harmony
 2012 Nothing But a Breeze/A Touch on the Rainy Side – Jesse Winchester –	Choir/Chorus
 2013 He's Faithful –   James Pullin & Remnant – Soprano vocals	
 2013 Purple Snow, Forecasting the Minneapolis Sound – Lead Vocals, Songwriter (1970s recording on compilation)

Filmography
 Live performance "Higher Ground" with ABC Youth Choir, Fitzgerald Theater in Saint Paul, Minnesota, 2001
 Funkytown, TV series, 2013
 Les Annees Bonheur, French TV show, 2014

Awards and recognitions
 Miss Black Minnesota USA, 1976
 Induction into the Minnesota Music Hall of Fame as a member of Lipps Inc
 Recipient of Platinum in the US, Double Platinum in Canada, Gold in France and Germany, Silver in the UK, among others, as the lead singer on  "Funkytown"
 Three Billboard Music Awards, 1980
 Three time Grammy Award Winner as a member of Sounds of Blackness, 1991, 1993 and 1998

References

External links

Cynthia Johnson is credited as a saxophonist on this compilation (containing "Funkytown")
Lipps Inc., Disco's Littlest, Oddest Conglomerate, Turns Minneapolis into An Unlikely 'Funkytown' (People Magazine –  July 28, 1980)
TV show Funkytown (Video Production by Megabien Entertainment – Sept. 2012)
Washington Post article "Funkytown: Digging on the rise of soul music in 1980s Minneapolis"

1956 births
Living people
20th-century African-American women singers
Musicians from Saint Paul, Minnesota
American dance musicians
American television personalities
American women television personalities
American women singer-songwriters
Singer-songwriters from Minnesota
20th-century American women singers
21st-century American women singers
American funk singers
American disco singers
American women pop singers
African-American rock singers
University of Minnesota Morris alumni
20th-century American singers
21st-century American singers
African-American songwriters
21st-century African-American women singers